Thomas Northcote Toller (1844–1930) was the first professor of English language at Manchester and one of the editors of An Anglo-Saxon Dictionary which had been begun by Joseph Bosworth. He was appointed to the chair in 1880 and retired in 1903. The annual Toller Lecture, which commemorates his achievements, is held in Manchester.

Biography 
Toller was born in Kettering, to Caroline (née Wallis) and Joseph Toller.

In 1880 he was appointed as Chair of English Language at the University of Manchester, and he retired in 1903.

References

External links 

 An Anglo-Saxon Dictionary, scanned page images and OCRed text. From the Germanic Lexicon Project.
 An Anglo-Saxon Dictionary, scanned page images. Digitized under the direction of Sean Crist.
 A Downloadable version of "An Anglo-Saxon Dictionary"
 Thomas Northcote Toller at the Oxford Dictionary of National Biography

1844 births
1930 deaths
Anglo-Saxon studies scholars